The discography of Jack & Jack consists of two EPs, twenty-four singles as a lead artist, ten singles as a featured artist and three promotional singles.

Their debut EP titled Calibraska, was released on July 24, 2015, independently. It peaked on the Billboard 200 at 12th. Their second EP, Gone, failed to repeat similar success as it didn't appear on any charts. It was released via Island Records. As a lead artist, Jack & Jack has had six singles to appear on a US chart, all of which were on Hot R&B/Hip-Hop Songs. "Wild Life" is their only song to appear on the Hot 100, it placed at 87th.

Their collaboration with Jonas Blue, a single titled "Rise" which was included in Blue's debut studio album Blue, had placed in the UK at 3rd and was certified double platinum by ARIA, platinum by the RMNZ, peaked in the Mainstream top 40 in the U.S. and was certified Gold by the RIAA. Jack & Jack released their debut studio album, A Good Friend Is Nice, on January 11, 2019, via Island Records and Universal Music.

In 2022, Jack & Jack reunited with two new singles "Runaway" and "Right Here With You".

Studio albums

Extended plays

Singles

As lead artist

As featured artist

Promotional singles

Music videos

Notes

References 

Discographies of American artists
Hip hop discographies
Pop music discographies